Jama Mohamoud Egal is a Somali politician, who is currently serving as the Minister of Energy and Minerals of Somaliland. He hails from Sanbuur sub-clan of the Habr Je'lo Isaaq

See also

 Ministry of Energy & Minerals (Somaliland)
 Politics of Somaliland
 List of Somaliland politicians

References

People from Hargeisa
Peace, Unity, and Development Party politicians
Living people
Government ministers of Somaliland
Year of birth missing (living people)